Richard Woghere (fl. 1378–1407), of East Grinstead, Sussex, was an English politician.

Family
His son, John Woghere, was also an MP for East Grinstead. His wife's name is unrecorded, and no other children are recorded.

Career
Woghere was bailiff of East Grinstead from 1382 to 1384. He was a Member (MP) of the Parliament of England for East Grinstead in 1378, May 1382, April 1384, November 1384, 1385, September 1388, 1399, 1402 and 1407.

References

14th-century births
15th-century deaths
English MPs 1378
English MPs May 1382
People from East Grinstead
English MPs April 1384
English MPs November 1384
English MPs 1385
English MPs September 1388
English MPs 1399
English MPs 1402
English MPs 1407